Calcium looping (CaL), or the regenerative calcium cycle (RCC), is a second-generation carbon capture technology. It is the most developed form of carbonate looping, where a metal (M) is reversibly reacted between its carbonate form (MCO3) and its oxide form (MO) to separate carbon dioxide from other gases coming from either power generation or an industrial plant. In the calcium looping process, the two species are calcium carbonate (CaCO3) and calcium oxide (CaO). The captured carbon dioxide can then be transported to a storage site, used in enhanced oil recovery or used as a chemical feedstock. Calcium oxide is often referred to as the sorbent.

Calcium looping is being developed as it is a more efficient, less toxic alternative to current post-combustion capture processes such as amine scrubbing. It also has interesting potential for integration with the cement industry.

Basic concept 

CaCO3 ←→ CaO + CO2  ΔH = +178 kJ/mol 

There are two main steps in CaL:
 Calcination: Solid calcium carbonate is fed into a calciner, where it is heated to 850-950 °C to cause it to thermally decompose into gaseous carbon dioxide and solid calcium oxide (CaO). The almost-pure stream of CO2 is then removed and purified so that it is suitable for storage or use. This is the 'forward' reaction in the equation above.
 Carbonation: The solid CaO is removed from the calciner and fed into the carbonator. It is cooled to approximately 650 °C and is brought into contact with a flue gas containing a low to medium concentration of CO2. The CaO and CO2 react to form CaCO3, thus reducing the CO2 concentration in the flue gas to a level suitable for emission to the atmosphere. This is the 'backward' reaction in the equation above.

Note that carbonation is calcination in reverse.

Whilst the process can be theoretically performed an infinite number of times, the calcium oxide sorbent degrades as it is cycled. For this reason, it is necessary to remove (purge) some of the sorbent from the system and replace it with fresh sorbent (often in the carbonate form). The size of the purge stream compared with the amount of sorbent going round the cycle affects the process considerably.

Background 
In the Ca-looping process, a CaO-based sorbent, typically derived from limestone, reacts via the reversible reaction described in Equation and is repeatedly cycled between two vessels.

The forward, endothermic step is called calcination while the backward, exothermic step is carbonation.

A typical Ca-looping process for post-combustion CO2  capture is shown in Figure 1, followed by a more detailed description.

Flue gas containing CO2 is fed to the first vessel (the carbonator), where carbonation occurs. The CaCO3 formed is passed to another vessel (the calciner). Calcination occurs at this stage, and the regenerated CaO is quickly passed back to the carbonator, leaving a pure CO2  stream behind. As this cycle continues, CaO sorbent is constantly replaced by fresh (reactive) sorbent. The highly concentrated CO2 from the calciner is suitable for sequestration, and the spent CaO has potential uses elsewhere, most notably in the cement industry.  The heat necessary for calcination can be provided by oxy-combustion of coal below.

Oxy-combustion of coal: Pure oxygen rather than air is used for combustion, eliminating the large amount of nitrogen in the flue-gas stream. After particulate matter is removed, flue gas consists only of water vapor and CO2, plus smaller amounts of other pollutants. After compression of the flue gas to remove water vapor and additional removal of air pollutants, a nearly pure CO2 stream suitable for storage is produced.

The carbonator's operating temperature of 650-700 °C is chosen as a compromise between higher equilibrium (maximum) capture at lower temperatures due to the exothermic nature of the carbonation step, and a decreased reaction rate. Similarly, the temperature of >850 °C in the calcinator strikes a balance between increased rate of calcination at higher temperatures and reduced rate of degradation of CaO sorbent at lower temperatures.

Process description 

CaL is usually designed using a dual fluidised bed system to ensure sufficient contact between the gas streams and the sorbent. The calciner and carbonator are fluidised beds with associated process equipment for separating the gases and solids attached (such as cyclones). Calcination is an endothermic process and as such requires the application of heat to the calciner. The opposite reaction, carbonation, is exothermic and heat must be removed. Since the exothermic reaction happens at about 650 °C and the endothermic reaction at 850-950 °C, the heat from the carbonator cannot be directly used to heat the calciner.

The fluidisation of the solid bed in the carbonator is achieved by passing the flue gas through the bed. In the calciner, some of the recovered CO2 is recycled through the system. Some oxygen may also be passed through the reactor if fuel is being burned in the calciner to provide energy.

Provision of energy to the calciner 

Heat can be provided for the endothermic calcination step either directly or indirectly.

Direct provision of heat involves the combustion of fuel in the calciner itself (fluidised bed combustion). This is generally assumed to be done under oxy-fuel conditions; i.e. oxygen rather than air is used to burn the fuel to prevent dilution of the CO2 with nitrogen. The provision of oxygen for the combustion uses much electricity; other air separation processes are being developed.

Indirect provision of heat to the calciner involves either:
 Combustion of fuel outside the vessel and conduction of energy in to the vessel
 Combustion of fuel in another vessel and use of a heat transfer medium.

Indirect methods are generally less efficient but do not require the provision of oxygen for combustion within the calciner to prevent dilution. The flue gas from the combustion of fuel in the indirect method could be mixed with the flue gas from the process that the CaL plant is attached to and passed through the carbonator to capture the CO2.

Recovery of energy from the carbonator 
Although the heat from the carbonator is not at a high enough temperature to be used in the calciner, the high temperatures involved (>600 °C) mean that a relatively efficient Rankine cycle for generating electricity can be operated.

Note that the waste heat from the market-leading amine scrubbing CO2 capture process is emitted at a maximum of 150 °C. The low temperature of this heat means that it contains much less exergy and can generate much less electricity through a Rankine or organic Rankine cycle.

This electricity generation is one of the main benefits of CaL over lower-temperature post-combustion capture processes as the electricity is an extra revenue stream (or reduces costs).

Sorbent degradation 
It has been shown that the activity of the sorbent reduces quite markedly in laboratory, bench-scale and pilot plant tests. This degradation has been attributed to three main mechanisms, as shown below.

Attrition 
Calcium oxide is friable, that is, quite brittle. In fluidised beds, the calcium oxide particles can break apart upon collision with the other particles in the fluidised bed or the vessel containing it. The problem seems to be greater in pilot plant tests than at a bench scale.

Sulfation 
Sulfation is a relatively slow reaction (several hours) compared with carbonation (<10 minutes); thus it is more likely that SO2 will come into contact with CaCO3 than CaO. However, both reactions are possible, and are shown below.

Indirect sulfation: CaO + SO2 + 1/2 O2 → CaSO4
Direct sulfation: CaCO3 +  + 1/2 O2 → CaSO4 + CO2

Because calcium sulfate has a greater molar volume than either CaO or CaCO3 a sulfated layer will form on the outside of the particle, which can prevent the uptake of CO2 by the CaO further inside the particle. Furthermore, the temperature at which calcium sulfate dissociates to CaO and SO2 is relatively high, precluding sulfation's reversibility at the conditions present in CaL.

Technical implications 
Calcium looping technology offers several technical advantages over amine scrubbing for carbon capture. Firstly, both carbonator and calciner can use fluidized bed technology, due to the good gas-solid contacting and uniform bed temperature. Fluidized bed technology has already been demonstrated at large scale: large (460MWe) atmospheric and pressurized systems exist, and there is not a need for intensive scaling up as there is for the solvent scrubbing towers used in amine scrubbing.

Also, the calcium looping process is energy efficient.  The heat required for the endothermic calcination of CaCO3 and the heat required to raise the temperature of fresh limestone from ambient temperature, can be provided by in-situ oxy-fired combustion of fuel in the calciner.  Although additional energy is required to separate O2 from N2, the majority of the energy input can be recovered because the carbonator reaction is exothermic and CO2 from the calciner can be used to power a steam cycle. A solid purge heat exchanger can also be utilized to recover energy from the deactivated CaO and coal ashes from the calciner. As a result, a relatively small efficiency penalty is imposed on the power process, where the efficiency penalty refers to the power losses for CO2 compression, air separation and steam generation. It is estimated at 6-8 % points, compared to 9.5-12.5 % from post combustion amine capture.

The main shortcoming of Ca-looping technology is the decreased reactivity of CaO through multiple calcination-carbonation cycles. This can be attributed to sintering and the permanent closure of small pores during carbonation.

Closure of small pores
The carbonation step is characterized by a fast initial reaction rate abruptly followed by a slow reaction rate (Figure 2).  The carrying capacity of the sorbent is defined as the number of moles of CO2 reacted in the period of fast reaction rate with respect to that of the reaction stoichiometry for complete conversion of CaO to CaCO3. As seen in Figure 2, while mass after calcination remains constant, the mass change upon carbonation- the carrying capacity- reduces with a large number of cycles. In calcination, porous CaO (molar volume = ) is formed in place of CaCO3 (.). On the other hand, in carbonation, the CaCO3 formed on the surface of a CaO particle occupies a larger molar volume. As a result, once a layer of carbonate has formed on the surface (including on the large internal surface of porous CaO), it impedes further CO2 capture. This product layer grows over the pores and seals them off, forcing carbonation to follow a slower, diffusion dependent mechanism.

Sintering
CaO is also prone to sintering, or change in pore shape, shrinkage and grain growth during heating. Ionic compounds such as CaO mostly sinter because of volume diffusion or lattice diffusion mechanics. As described by sintering theory, vacancies generated by temperature sensitive defects direct void sites from smaller to larger ones, explaining the observed growth of large pores and the shrinkage of small pores in cycled limestone. It was found that sintering of CaO increases at higher temperatures and longer calcination durations, whereas carbonation time has minimal effect on particle sintering. A sharp increase in sintering of particles is observed at temperatures above 1173 K, causing a reduction in reactive surface area and a corresponding decrease in reactivity.

Solutions: Several options to reduce sorbent deactivation are currently being researched. An ideal sorbent would be mechanically strong, maintain its reactive surface through repeated cycles, and be reasonably inexpensive. Using thermally pre-activated particles or reactivating spent sorbents through hydration are two promising options.  Thermally pre-activated particles have been found to retain activity for up to a thousand cycles. Similarly, particles reactivated by hydration show improved long term (after~20 cycles) conversions.

Disposal of waste sorbent

Properties of waste sorbent 
After cycling several times and being removed from the calcium loop, the waste sorbent will have attrited, sulfated and become mixed with the ash from any fuel used. The amount of ash in the waste sorbent will depend on the fraction of the sorbent being removed and the ash and calorific content of the fuel. The size fraction of the sorbent is dependent on the original size fraction but also the number of cycles used and the type of limestone used.

Disposal routes 
Proposed disposal routes of waste sorbent include:
 Landfill;
 Disposal at sea;
 Use in cement manufacture;
 Use in flue gas desulfurisation (FGD).

The lifecycle CO2 emissions for power generation with CaL and the first three disposal techniques have been calculated. Before disposal of the CaO coal power with CaL has a similar level of lifecycle emissions as amine scrubbing but with the CO2-absorbing properties of CaO CaL becomes significantly less polluting. Ocean disposal was found to be the best, but current laws relating to dumping waste at sea prevent this. Next best was use in cement manufacture, reducing emissions over an unabated coal plant by 93%.

Use in cement manufacture 
Portland cement is approximately two-thirds calcium oxide by mass and its manufacture is responsible for approximately 8% of the world's CO2  emissions. 60% of this CO2  comes from the calcination of calcium carbonate as shown earlier in this article, and the other 40% from fossil fuel combustion. By replacing some or all of the calcium carbonate entering the plant with waste calcium oxide, the CO2  caused from calcination can be avoided, as well as some of the CO2  from fossil fuel combustion.

This calcium oxide could be sourced from other point sources of CO2  such as power stations, but most effort has been focussed on integrating calcium looping with Portland cement manufacture. By replacing the calciner in the cement plant with a calcium looping plant, it should be possible to capture 90% or more of the CO2  relatively inexpensively. There are alternative set-ups such as placing the calcium looping plant in the preheater section so as to make the plant as efficient as possible.

Some work has been undertaken into whether calcium looping affects the quality of the Portland cement produced, but results so far seem to suggest that the production of strength-giving phases such as alite are similar for calcium looped and non-calcium looped cement.

Direct Separation Technology 
Calix achieves this by calcining finely ground CaCO3 continuously down vertical reactor tubes. The reactor tubes are heated from the outside using electricity or fuel ensuring the  stream is pure and not contaminated with air or combustion products.

This technology has been successfully piloted in Europe by a cooperative industry group with support from the European Union as the Low Emission Intensity Lime And Cement (LEILAC1) reactor project.  The study report concluded that the technology could capture C02 from full scale lime and cement kilns at €14 to €24/t. Transport and storage costs are not included in this estimate and will be dependent upon infrastructure available near the cement or lime plant

A FEED study is underway for a larger commercial demonstration kiln proposed for the  Heidelberg Cement plant in Hannover (LEILAC2). This commercial demonstration kiln is designed to capture 100ktpa . A  final investment decision for this project is expected early 2022.

This type of kiln is also being studied as a potential method to decarbonise shipping through both looping and single use processes.  The single use process would involve using CaCO3 to be sown over the ocean, thereby permanently capturing addition carbon from the ocean as the CaCO3 reacts to form Ca(HCO3)2 and reversing ocean acidification.

Economic implications 

Calcium looping has several economic advantages.

Cost per metric ton for CO2 captured 
Firstly, Ca-looping offers greater cost advantage compared to conventional amine-scrubbing technologies. The cost/metric ton for CO2 captured through Ca-looping is ~$23.70 whereas that for CO2 captured through amine scrubbing is about $35–$96.  This can be attributed to the high availability and low cost of the CaO sorbent (derived from limestone) as compared to MEA. Also, as discussed in section 2, Ca-looping imposes a lower energy penalty than amine scrubbing, resulting in lower energy costs. The amine scrubbing process is energy intensive, with approximately 67% of the operating costs going into steam requirements for solvent regeneration. A more detailed comparison of Ca-looping and amine scrubbing is shown below.

Cost of CO2 emissions avoided through Ca-looping

In addition, the cost of CO2 emissions avoided through Ca-looping is lower than the cost of emissions avoided via an oxyfuel combustion process (~US$23.8/t). This can be explained by the fact that, despite the capital costs incurred in constructing the carbonator for Ca-looping, CO2 will not only be captured from the oxy-fired combustion, but also from the main combustor (before the carbonator). The oxygen required in the calciners is only 1/3 that required for an oxyfuel process, lowering air separation unit capital costs and operating costs.

Sensitivity Analysis: Figure 3 shows how varying 8 separate parameters affects the cost/metric ton of CO2 captured through Ca-looping. It is evident that the dominant variables that affect cost are related to sorbent use, the Ca/C ratio and the CaO deactivation ratio. This is because the large sorbent quantities required dominate the economics of the capture process.

These variables should therefore be taken into account to achieve further cost reductions in the Ca-looping process. The cost of limestone is largely driven by market forces, and is outside the control of the plant. Currently, carbonators require a Ca/C ratio of 4 for effective CO2 capture. However, if the Ca/C ratio or CaO deactivation is reduced (i.e. the sorbent can be made to work more efficiently), the reduction in material consumption and waste can lower feedstock demand and operating costs.

Cement production
Finally, favorable economics can be achieved by using the purged material from the calcium looping cycle in cement production. The raw feed for cement production includes ~ 85 wt% limestone with the remaining material consisting of clay and additives (e.g. SiO2, Al2O3 etc.). The first step in the process involves calcinating limestone to produce CaO, which is then mixed with other materials in a kiln to produce clinker.

Using purged material from a Ca-looping system would reduce the raw material costs for cement production. Waste CaO and ash can be used in place of CaCO3 (the main constituent cement feed). The ash could also fulfill the aluminosilicate requirements otherwise supplied by additives. Since over 60% of the energy used in cement production goes into heat input for the precalciner, this integration with Ca-looping and the consequent reduced need for a calcination step, could lead to substantial energy savings (EU, 2001). However, there are problems with using the waste CaO in cement manufacture. If the technology is applied on a large scale, the purge rate of CaO should be optimized to minimize waste.

Political and environmental implications 
To fully gauge the viability of calcium looping as a capture process, it is necessary to consider the political, environmental, and health effects of the process as well.

Political implications
Though many recent scientific reports (e.g.: the seven-wedge stabilization plan by Pacala and Socolow) convey an urgent need to deploy CCS, this urgency has not spread to the political establishment, mainly due to the high costs and energy penalty of CCS  The economics of calcium looping are integral to its political viability.  One economic and political advantage is the ability for Ca-looping to be retrofitted onto existing power plants, rather than requiring new plants to be built. The IEA sees power plants as an important target for carbon capture, and has set the goal to have all fossil fuel based power plants deploy CCS systems by 2040. However, power plants are expensive to build, and long lived. Retrofitting of post-combustion capture systems, such as Ca-looping, seems to be the only politically and economically viable way to achieve the IEA's goal.

A further political advantage is the potential synergy between calcium looping and cement production.  An IEA report concludes that to meet emission reduction goals, there should be 450 CCS projects in India and China by 2050. However, this could be politically difficult, especially with these nations' numerous other development goals. After all, for a politician to commit money to CCS might be less advantageous than to commit it to job schemes or agricultural subsidies. Here, the integration of calcium looping with the prosperous and (particularly with infrastructure expansion in the developing world) vital cement industry might prove compelling to the political establishment.

This potential synergy with the cement industry also provides environmental benefits by simultaneously reducing the waste output of the looping process and decarbonizing cement production.  Cement manufacture is energy and resource intensive, consuming 1.5 tonnes of material per tonne of cement produced. In the developing world, economic growth will drive infrastructure growth, increasing cement demand. Deploying a waste product for cement production could therefore have a large, positive environmental impact.

Environmental implications
The starting material for calcium looping is limestone, which is environmentally benign and widely available, accounting for over 10% (by volume) of all sedimentary rock. Limestone is already mined and cheaply obtainable. The mining process has no major known adverse environmental effects, beyond the unavoidable intrusiveness of any mining operation. However, as the following calculation shows, despite integration with cement industry, waste from Ca-looping can still be a problem.

From the environmental and health standpoint, Ca-looping compares favorably with amine scrubbing. Amine scrubbing is known to generate air pollutants, including amines and ammonia, which can react to form carcinogenic nitrosamines. Calcium looping, on the other hand, does not produce harmful pollutants. In addition, not only does it capture CO2, but it also removes the pollutant SO2 from the flue gas.  This is both an advantage and disadvantage, as the air quality improves, but the captured SO2 has a detrimental effect on the cement that is generated from the calcium looping wastes.

Advantages and drawbacks

Advantages of the process 
Calcium looping is considered as potential promising solutions to reduce CO2  capture energy penalty. There are many advantages from the calcium looping methods. Firstly, the method has been proved to yield a low efficiency penalties (5-8% points) while other mature CO2   capture systems yield a higher efficiency penalties (8-12.5%). Moreover, the method is well suited for a wide range of flue gases. Calcium looping is applicable for new builds and retrofits to existing power stations or other stationary industrial CO2 sources because the method can be implemented using large-scale circulating fluidized beds while other methods such as amine scrubbing is required a vastly upscale solvent scrubbing towers.  In addition, crushed limestone used in calcium looping as the sorbent is a natural product, which is well distributed all over the world, non-hazardous and inexpensive. Many cement manufacturers or power plants located close to limestone sources could conceivably employ Calcium looping for CO2  capture. The waste sorbent can be used in cement manufacture.

Drawbacks 
Apart from these advantages, there are several disadvantages needed to take into considerations.  The plant integrating Ca-Looping might require a high construction investment because of the high thermal power of the post-combustion calcium loop. The sorbent capacity decreases significantly with the number of cycles for every carbonation-calcination cycle so the calcium-looping unit will require a constant flow of limestone. In order to increase the long-term reactivity of the sorbent or to reactivate the sorbent, some methods are under investigation such as thermal pretreatment, chemical doping and the production of artificial sorbents. The method applying the concept of fluidized bed reactor, but there are some problems causing the uncertainty for the process. Attrition of the limestone can be a problem during repeated cycling.

Benefits of calcium looping compared with other post-combustion capture processes 
Calcium looping compares favorably with several post-combustion capture technologies. Amine scrubbing is the capture technology closest to being market-ready, and calcium looping has several marked benefits over it. When modeled on a 580 MW coal-fired power plant, Calcium looping experienced not only a smaller efficiency penalty (6.7-7.9% points compared to 9.5% for monoethanolamine and 9% for chilled ammonia) but also a less complex retrofitting process. Both technologies would require the plant to be retrofitted for adoption, but the calcium looping retrofitting process would result in twice the net power output of the scrubbing technology. Furthermore, this advantage can be compounded by introducing technology such as cryogenic O2 separation systems. This ups the efficiency of the calcium looping technology by increasing the energy density by 57.4%, making the already low energy penalties even less of an issue.

Calcium looping already has an energy advantage over amine scrubbing, but the main problem is that amine scrubbing is the more market-ready technology. However, the accompanying infrastructure for amine scrubbing include large solvent scrubbing towers, the likes of which have never been used on an industrial scale. The accompanying infrastructure for calcium looping capture technologies are circulating fluidized beds, which have already been implemented on an industrial scale. Although the individual technologies differ in terms of current technological viability, the fact that the infrastructure needed to properly implement an amine scrubbing system has yet to be developed keeps calcium looping competitive from a viability standpoint.

Sample evaluation

Assumptions 
  For a Ca-looping cycle installed on a 500 MW power plant, the purge rate is 12.6 kg CaO/s.
  For the cement production process, 0.65 kg CaO is required/ kg cement produced.
  U.S. electric generation capacity (only fossil fuels): Natural gas = 415 GW, Coal= 318 GW & Petroleum = 51 GW 
  Cement consumption in U.S. = 110,470 × 103 metric tons = 1.10470 × 108 metric tons = 1.10470 × 1011 kg.

Calculations 
For a single Ca-looping cycle installed on a 500MW power plant:

 Amount of CaO from purge annually = 12.6 kg CaO/s × 365 days/year × 24 hr/day × 3600s / hour = 3.97 × 108 kg CaO/ year
 Cement that can be obtained from purge annually= 3.97 × 108 kg CaO/ year × 1 kg cement/ 0.65 kg CaO = 6.11 × 108 kg cement/year
 Net electricity generation in US:  (415 + 318 + 51) GW = 784 GW = 7.84 × 1011 W
 Number of 500 MW power plants: 7.84 × 1011 W / 5.00 × 108 W = 1568 power plants
 Amount of cement that can be produced from Ca-looping waste: 1568 × 6.11 × 108 kg cement/ year = 9.58 × 1011 kg cement/year
 Production from Ca-looping waste as percent of total annual cement consumption = [(9.58 × 1011 kg)/ (1.10470 × 1011 kg)] × 100 = 870%

Therefore, amount of cement production from Ca-looping waste of all fossil fuel based electric power plants in US will be far greater than net consumption. To make Ca-looping more viable, waste must be minimized (i.e. sorbent degradation reduced) to ideally about 1/10th of current levels.

References 

Carbon capture and storage
Chemical engineering
Chemical processes